Eliphaz Fay (April 27, 1797 – March 19, 1854) served as the fourth president of Colby College (then called the Waterville College) in Maine.

Personal life
Fay was born to Solomon Fay, and Suzannah Morse, a schoolteacher in Marlborough, Massachusetts. Graduated from Brown University in 1821. He married Mary Helen (Lee) on April 20, 1829. His children were Susan Mary, William Wirt, Henry Harrison, Caroline Louise.

Work
Fay had a career as a lawyer. In 1832 he was the first principal of New Paltz Academy.  From 1833-1834 he published The Independence, a newspaper in Poughkeepsie, New York, which "advocate(d) the cause of Anti-Masonry, literature, science, temperance, morality and religion."
Editor: Eliphaz Fay, 1832-1834.

Elected President of Colby College in August 1841, after a year when the college had no president for the prior year.  The enrollment was 76.

References

External links
The Evening of Life, written by Chaplin, and republished several times
Portrait of Chaplin

1797 births
1854 deaths
Presidents of Colby College
Brown University alumni
19th-century Baptist ministers from the United States